The 2016 International Tennis Federation (ITF) Women's Circuit is a second-tier tour for women's professional tennis. It is organized by the International Tennis Federation and is a tier below the Women's Tennis Association (WTA) Tour. The ITF Women's Circuit includes tournaments with prize money ranging from $10,000 to $100,000.

Schedule

Key

January–March

April–June

July–September

October–December

Participating host nations

Tournament breakdown by event category

Ranking points distribution 

 "+H" indicates that hospitality is provided.

Retired players

Statistics

Key

Titles won by player

Titles won by nation

See also 
 2016 WTA Tour
 2016 WTA 125K series
 2016 ATP World Tour
 2016 ATP Challenger Tour
 2016 ITF Men's Circuit

References

External links 
 International Tennis Federation (ITF)

 
2016
2016 in tennis
2016 in women's tennis